Michael Anthony McNulty (born 14 December 1982), known professionally as Matthew McNulty, is a German-born British actor.

Early life
McNulty was born on 14 December 1982 in Hanover, Lower Saxony, West Germany, and lived in Berlin and Münster before moving to Atherton, Greater Manchester, England when he was 10 years old. He attended Hesketh Fletcher high school and then Winstanley College 

He changed his stage name to Matthew McNulty when he obtained his Equity card, as there was already another Michael McNulty on the Equity list.

Personal life
McNulty and his wife Katie have two sons and a daughter.

Filmography

Film

Television

References

External links

Matthew McNulty at Hamilton Hodell

1982 births
Living people
Actors from Hanover
English male film actors
English male television actors
Male actors from Manchester
21st-century English male actors